Prophilopota is an extinct genus of small-headed flies in the family Acroceridae. It is known from Baltic amber from the Eocene.

Species
The genus contains two species:
 †Prophilopota succinea Hennig, 1966 – unknown locality (possibly Denmark)
 †Prophilopota variegata Gillung & Winterton, 2017 – Kaliningrad Oblast, Russia

References

Acroceridae
†
Prehistoric Diptera genera
Taxa named by Willi Hennig
Baltic amber
Eocene insects